Vladislav Frolov (born 6 January 1992) is a Paralympic athlete from Russia. He competes in seated throwing events in the F32 classification, specializing in the club throw and shot put.

Athletic career
Frolov began training as an athlete at Bryansk in 2008. He came to prominence in 2014 when he represented Russia at the 2014 IPC Athletics European Championships in Swansea. There he entered both the club throw and shot put. In the shot put he threw a distance of 9.02, more than a metre more than his nearest rival to secure his first international gold medal. He followed this with a second gold, when he beat Britain's Stephen Miller in the T32 club throw.

The following year he travelled to Doha to take part in the 2015 IPC Athletics World Championships. In the shot put, as in Swansea, he dominated the field, winning comfortably with a distance of 9.02m. He followed this with a victory in the club throw, where he threw 35.94 to better his own world record he had set four months earlier.

In the run up to the Summer Paralympics in Rio Frolov competed at the 2016 IPC Athletics European Championships in Grosseto. He successfully defended his shot put title, but suffered his first major international defeat in the club throw, where despite recording a personal best of 36.13, he was beaten into second place by a new world record thrown by Poland's Maciej Sochal.

Notes

Paralympic athletes of Russia
Living people
1992 births
World record holders in Paralympic athletics
Track and field athletes with disabilities
Russian club throwers
Russian male shot putters
Male club throwers
21st-century Russian people